"Mother & Father" is a song by New Zealand musical duo Broods from their debut studio album, Evergreen (2014). As with the material on their self-titled debut EP, "Mother & Father" was written by duo members Caleb and Georgia Nott as well as producer Joel Little. It was released as the album's  lead single on 19 June 2014 through Polydor Records. The song entered the New Zealand Singles Chart at number forty on 30 June 2014, then moved to number fourteen the following week.

Critical reception
Bradley Stern of music blog Idolator described the song as "nothing short of an emotional triumph" and applauded the duo's artistic and emotional growth. "It's the sound of growing up," writes Stern, "still unsure, but soldiering on anyway — and they’ve captured it wonderfully in this promising first taste of what’s to come." Timothy Monger at AllMusic complimented the stylistic layers to the duo's music, writing that "the massive hooks and neatly stacked vocals on standouts like "Mother & Father" and the kinetic "L.A.F." showcase the duo's command of enchanting and melodic indie electropop."

Music video
Directed by Jordan Arts, the music video for "Mother & Father" was made available on 15 July 2014 and is shown in black-and-white.

Live performances
On 17 July 2014, Broods performed "Mother & Father" on the talk show Late Night with Seth Meyers.

Charts and certifications

Weekly charts

Certifications

Release history

References

2014 songs
2014 singles
Broods songs
Black-and-white music videos